The Falcon in Hollywood is a 1944 crime film directed by Gordon Douglas and stars Tom Conway in his recurring role as a suave amateur sleuth, supported by Barbara Hale, Jean Brooks, and Rita Corday. The film was the 10th of 16 in Falcon detective series.

Plot
While on vacation in Los Angeles, Tom Lawrence, aka The Falcon, meets Inspector McBride at the Hollywood Park Racetrack, asking him about casino owner Louie Buchanan. Lawrence helped put Buchanan away but does not know his present whereabouts.

Returning to his seat, Lawrence finds Buchanan standing behind him. Seated next to Tom is actress Lili D'Allio. When she leaves to make a bet, Peggy Callahan sits down in her spot; when she departs, she takes Lili's purse by mistake. Tom hails a cab, driven by wisecracking Billie Atkins to try to catch up to Callahan, an actress at the Sunset Studio.

Hearing a gunshot, Lawrence rushes to a deserted sound stage, where he finds a corpse; he notices a large, unusual ring on the dead man's finger. When he brings a studio guard, the body is not there. After stumbling across the body, missing the ring, in a prop room, Atkins identifies the deceased as leading man Ted Miles, who was married to Roxanna, the studio's costume designer. Bringing autocratic director Alec Hoffman, whom she says she will marry, Roxanna exhibits no emotion when shown her former husband's body.

Everything seems to be tied to a current production produced by neurotic studio executive Martin Dwyer. Accompanied by Atkins, the Falcon pokes around the studio. Suspects are starlet Peggy Callahan, haughty prima donna Lili D'Alio and Louie Buchanan.

Police Inspector McBride questions Dwyer, who seems to have a rock-solid alibi, until his gun shows up in the model shop, hidden in a plaster head. When he states he reported his gun as stolen weeks ago, suspicion falls on Hoffman, who is arrested but gets out on bail. The "jinxed" film goes back into production.

As instructed, Callahan shoots Hoffman with a prop gun in a scene, unaware that it has been loaded with live ammunition. Hoffman is badly wounded. While McBride questions the crew about the shooting, Lawrence finds Callahan and Buchanan conferring in secret, with Buchanan promising to deliver the killer the next day at the Los Angeles Coliseum. Callahan holds Lawrence at gunpoint, allowing Buchanan to escape. Buchanan arrives as promised, but dies on the steps. Tom finds a poisoned ring on his finger, identical to the one he saw on Miles. With the police homing in on him, Dwyer makes a break for it. In a studio soundstage, he and Lawrence engage in a furious gun battle. Dwyer is shot and falls to his death.

Lawrence concludes that Dwyer has sold each of eight investors a 25% interest in the film. He then tried to sabotage the film so he would not have to pay them off. However, when the director and cast started making a good film despite his efforts, Dwyer resorted to homicide. He murdered Ted Miles and Louie Buchanan because they knew too much.

Cast

 Tom Conway as Tom Lawrence
 Barbara Hale as Peggy Callahan
 Jean Brooks as Roxanna Miles
 Rita Corday as Lili D'Allio
 Veda Ann Borg as Billie Atkins
 John Abbott as Martin S. Dwyer
 Sheldon Leonard as Louie Buchanan
 Konstantin Shayne as Alec Hoffman
 Emory Parnell as Inspector McBride
 Frank Jenks as Lieutenant Higgins
 Walter Soderling as Ed Johnson
 Useff Ali as Mohammed Nogari
 Robert Clarke as Perc Saunders
 Carl Kent as Art director
 Gwen Crawford as Secretary
 Patti Brill as Secretary
 Bryant Washburn as Actor's agent
 Sammy Blum as Actor's agent
 Greta Christensen as Girl
 Margie Stewart as Girl
 Virginia Belmont as Girl
 Nancy Marlow as Mail clerk
 Chris Drake as Assistant cameraman
 Jimmy Jordan as Operator
 George De Normand as Truck driver
 Perc Launders as Zoller
 Jacques Lory as Musician
 Chili Williams as Beautiful blonde
 Chester Clute as Hotel manager

Production
RKO studios doubled for the fictional Sunset Studio.

Reception
In his review of The Falcon in Hollywood, Bosley Crowther wrote, in The New York Times, "A mild intra-mural excursion around a movie studio is the only intriguing feature of RKO's 'The Falcon in Hollywood,' latest in the well-worn mystery series, which came to the Rialto yesterday. For otherwise this obvious whodunnit about murder on a studio set is just another indifferent workout for Tom Conway as the suave, intuitive sleuth. The backgrounds of picture-making are uncommonly interesting and lead one to wonder sharply why they haven't been used to more avail. But the story itself is as feeble and hackneyed as a prop telephone." In a recent review of the Falcon series for the Time Out Film Guide, Tom Milne wrote, "Conway, bringing a lighter touch to the series (which managed its comic relief better than most), starred in nine films after The Falcon's Brother, most of them deft and surprisingly enjoyable."

References
Informational notes

Citations

Bibliography
 Jewell, Richard and Harbin, Vernon (1982) The RKO Story. New Rochelle, New York: Arlington House. 
 Pym, John, editor (2004) Time Out Film Guide. London: Time Out Guides Limited.

External list
 
 
 The Falcon in Hollywood at IMDb
 
 Review of film at Variety

1944 films
RKO Pictures films
1944 crime drama films
American crime drama films
American black-and-white films
The Falcon (film character) films
Films directed by Gordon Douglas
1940s American films